The Melqart stele, also known as the Ben-Hadad or Bir-Hadad stele is an Aramaic stele which was created during the 9th century BCE and was discovered in 1939 in Roman ruins in Bureij Syria (7 km north of Aleppo). The Old Aramaic inscription is known as KAI 201; its five lines reads:

“The stele which Bar-Had-
-ad, son of [...]

king of Aram, erected to his Lord Melqar-

-t, to whom he made a vow and who heard his voi-
-ce.”

According to William Foxwell Albright, the stele should be attributed to Ben-Hadad I, an Aramean king mentioned in the First Book of Kings. However, Kenneth Kitchen disagrees and states that there is no actual evidence that connects the Melqart stele to Ben-Hadad I. a recent re-analysis of the stele indicated that the Ben-Hadad referred to is actually the king of Arpad.

Bibliography
 Maurice Dunand, Stèle araméenne dédiée à Melqart, Bulletin du Musée de Beyrouth III (1939), p. 65–76
 
 
 
 
 
 Black, Matthew. "The Milqart Stele." In Documents from Old Testament Times. Edited by D. W. Thomas, 239-41. London: Thomas Nelson, 1958. Reprinted, Ancient Texts and Translations. Eugene, OR: Wipf & Stock, 2005.

See also
List of artifacts significant to the Bible

Notes

9th-century BC steles
1939 archaeological discoveries
Ancient Near East steles
Aramaic inscriptions
Archaeological discoveries in Syria
KAI inscriptions